Daudpur  is a village in Kapurthala district of Punjab State, India. The village is administrated by a Sarpanch, who is an elected representative.

Demography 
According to the report published by Census India in 2011, Daudpur has a total number of 210 houses and population of 1,032 of which include 563 males and 469 females. Literacy rate of Daudpur is 79.11%, higher than state average of 75.84%. The population of children under the age of 6 years is 113 which is  10.95% of total population of Daudpur, and child sex ratio is approximately  738, lower than state average of 846.

Caste  
The village has schedule caste (SC) constitutes 29.46% of total population of the village and it doesn't have any Schedule Tribe (ST) population.

Population data

Air travel connectivity 
The closest airport to the village is Sri Guru Ram Dass Jee International Airport.

Villages in Kapurthala

External links
  Villages in Kapurthala
 Kapurthala Villages List

References

Villages in Kapurthala district